Chindi is a 2002 science fiction novel by American writer Jack McDevitt of starship pilot Priscilla "Hutch" Hutchins series.

Plot overview
Alien stealth satellites have been discovered orbiting various habitable planets (eventually including Earth) across space. The Contact Society, a group of rich alien enthusiasts, set out in a brand new superluminal, with Hutch as captain, in search of the source of the strange satellites. As they travel they find a species of sentient spider-like beings who destroyed themselves in a nuclear war, a species of avian beings who look beautiful but are really savages, and a technically advanced alien retreat on an artificial moon. Then Chindi is discovered. A giant asteroid ship, almost 16 km (9.9 miles) long, it seems to have no reasonable use; but when they enter it, they begin to discover its true purpose.

References

External links
 Chindi at Worlds Without End
 Chindi - Comments by the Author at Jack Mcdevitts Website
 Chindi Preview At Science Fiction & Fantasy Writers America

Novels by Jack McDevitt
American science fiction novels
2002 American novels
2002 science fiction novels
Ace Books books